The 2022-23 Primera División Femenina de Fútbol season, renamed Liga F (finetwork Liga F for sponsorship reasons), is the 35th edition of the Primera División Femenina de España de fútbol, and the first edition with professional status in its history. The tournament is organized by the Liga Profesional Femenina de Fútbol (LPFF). The competition was supposed to start on 10 September 2022, but the first week matches were postponed. As a result, the competition started on 17 September 2022, and will end on 21 May 2023.

Barcelona are the defending champions after winning undefeated the previous season.

Summary

Postponements
On 8 September 2022, the Royal Spanish Football Federation (RFEF) referees threaten to not attend any Matchday 1 as part of their continue strike for higher wages. As a result, all Liga F matches scheduled for 10–11 September were postponed after clubs were ready to play, but referees did not participate.

On 15 September 2022, a deal was reached between the parties to end the strike, which paved the way for the league season to start.

Sponsorship
On 6 October 2022, the LPFF announced the telecommunication company Finetwork (stylized finetwork) would become the official league sponsor for the next three seasons. As a result, the league will be renamed finetwork Liga F.

Teams

Promoted from Primera Federación
Alhama was promoted to the top flight for the first in its history. Levante Las Planas return after being relegated in the 2013–14 season.

Relegated to Primera Federación
Eibar were relegated after two seasons, while Rayo Vallecano after spending 19 years in the first division.

Stadia and locations

Personnel and sponsorship

Managerial changes

League table

Standings

Results

Positions by round
The table lists the positions of teams after each week of matches. In order to preserve chronological evolvements, any postponed matches are not included to the round at which they were originally scheduled, but added to the full round they were played immediately afterwards.

Season Statistics

Goalscorers

Assists

Hat-tricks

Clean sheets

Scoring 

 First goal of the season:  Lucía Pardo for Madrid CFF against Deportivo Alavés (17 September 2022)
 Last goal of the season:

Discipline 
Player

 Most yellow cards: 8
 Núria Garrote (Levante Las Planas)
 Aldana Cometti (Madrid CFF)
 Yenifer Giménez (Villarreal)
 Most red cards: 1
 Diana Gomes (Sevilla)
 Klára Cahynová (Sevilla)
 Tere (Sevilla)
 Rosa Otermín (Sevilla)
 Morgane Nicoli (Sevilla)
 Nazareth Martín (Sevilla)
 Patri Gavira (UDG Tenerife)
 Thaís Ferreira (UDG Tenerife)
 Lidia Sánchez (Real Betis)
 Ana Tejada (Real Sociedad)
 Ana González (Madrid CFF)
 Lena Pérez (Alhama CF)
 Zaira Flores (Alhama CF)
 Olivia Oprea (Alhama CF)
 Núria Garrote (Levante Las Planas)
 Nerea Gantxegi (Levante Las Planas)
 Paola Soldevila (Villarreal)
 Bicho (Villarreal)
 Irene Miguélez (Villarreal)
 Chelsea Ashurst (Sporting de Huelva)
 Sandra Castelló (Sporting de Huelva)
 Athena Kühn (Sporting de Huelva)
 Raiderlin Carrasco (Sporting de Huelva)
 Emmanuella Aby (Deportivo Alavés)
 Maite Zubieta (Athletic Club)

Team

 Most yellow cards: 44
 Deportivo Alavés
 Most red cards: 6
 Sevilla

Number of teams by autonomous community

References

External links
Official website 
Primera División at RFEF 
Primera División at La Liga 

2022-23
Spa
1
women's